Aslan Kobakhia is one of three current Vice Premiers and the current Minister for Internal Affairs of Abkhazia.

Early life and education
Aslan Kobakhia was born on 23 March 1960 in Lykhny, Gudauta District. Between 1981 and 1985 he studied at the Economics Faculty of the Abkhazian State University.

Political career
In 1997, Kobakhia became Chairman of the State Committee for Customs in the Government of President Ardzinba under Prime Minister Sergei Bagapsh. He was re-appointed under Prime Ministers Viacheslav Tsugba and Anri Jergenia. On 18 December 2002, following the appointment of Gennadi Gagulia as Prime Minister, Kobakhia was replaced by Gagra District Head Grigori Enik.

In the March 2012 election, Kobakhia was elected to the 5th convocation of the People's Assembly of Abkhazia in constituency no. 2 (Sukhumi). He won a 25.35% plurality in the first round over six other candidates and defeated Akhra Abukhba in the run-off. Kobakhia had been nominated by the opposition Forum for the National Unity of Abkhazia and became one of four of its eleven candidates to be elected to the 35-member Parliament.

On 16 August 2016, Kobakhia entered the Government of President Khajimba when he was appointed as one of three Vice Premiers and Minister for Internal Affairs in the cabinet of Prime Minister Beslan Bartsits.

References

1960 births
People from Gudauta District
Ministers for Internal Affairs of Abkhazia
Chairmen of the State Committee for Customs of Abkhazia
5th convocation of the People's Assembly of Abkhazia
Living people